Russkoye Ursayevo (Urıś Ursayı) is a rural locality (a selo) in Yenebey-Ursayevsky Selsoviet, Miyakinsky District, Bashkortostan, Russia. The population was 28 as of 2010. There are 2 streets.

Geography 
Russkoye Ursayevo is located 23 km west of Kirgiz-Miyaki (the district's administrative centre) by road. Chiryashtamak is the nearest rural locality.

References 

Rural localities in Miyakinsky District